Tabayin Township  is a township in Shwebo District in the Sagaing Division of Burma. The principal town is Tabayin.

References

External links
Maplandia World Gazetteer - map showing the township boundary

Townships of Sagaing Region